Abbeydale Grange School was a mixed comprehensive school in Sheffield, England, established in 1958 and closed after the 2009/10 academic year, after being listed amongst the schools with the worst GCSE examination results.

Admissions
The school was set in a green site off Abbeydale Road (part of the A621), a short bus journey from Sheffield city centre.  It served both the local area and the wider city community.

Upper school
The Upper School was north of the Lower School site.

Lower school
The Lower School site closed in July 2010, and was adjacent, to the south of the Upper School site.

Redevelopment
After the School was closed the site was cleared, and in 2016 it was announced that a new housing development was to be constructed on the former lower school land.

History

Grammar school
The school originated in 1958 as Abbeydale Boy's Grammar School. At its start the school had a strong academic reputation. The building of this school had begun in 1956 and was the replacement for Nether Edge Grammar School which had been founded in 1927.

This school originated in 1966, a replacement for Nether Edge Grammar school for boys. It became Abbeydale Grange Comprehensive School in 1969 The school became a mixed school at that time by joining with Abbeydale Grammar school for girls.

Comprehensive
It became a comprehensive in 1969. The school closed in 2010 because of the low exam results.

Notable alumni 
 Sebastian Coe (Now Baron Coe, of Ranmore), multi-gold medal-winning Olympic athlete and former chair of the UK Olympic Committee
 Kevin Davies, English football player who is currently a free agent
 Mukhtar Mohammed, Middle-distance runner
 Gerald Phiri, Zambian 100 m sprinter who qualified for the semi-finals of the London 2012 Olympic Games
 Si Spencer, television dramatist and graphic novelist

Abbeydale Boys' Grammar School
 Paul Blomfield, Labour MP since 2010 for Sheffield Central
 Dr Peter Briggs OBE, chief executive from 1990 to 2002 of the British Association for the Advancement of Science (since 2009 known as the British Science Association), and principal from 2002 to 2009 of Southlands College, Roehampton
 Sir Keith Povey, HM Chief Inspector of Constabulary from 2002 to 2005, chief constable from 1993 to 1997 of Leicestershire Constabulary
 Peter Wheeler, chemical engineer

Abbeydale Girls' Grammar School
 Sue Biggs, chief executive since 2010 of the Royal Horticultural Society (RHS)
 Lorna Binns, watercolour artist
 Valerie Howarth, Baroness Howarth of Breckland OBE, founder director from 1987 to 2001 of ChildLine 
 Margaret Spurr OBE, president from 1985 to 1986 of the Girls' Schools Association, and a governor from 1993 to 1998 of the BBC

Nether Edge Grammar School
 Sir Leslie Fletcher DSC, chairman from 1989 to 1994 of Westland Group and from 1992 to 1995 of the Rank Organisation
 Jack Smith, artist
 Bob Stirling, rugby player
 Prof Charles Tottle, professor of medical engineering from 1975 to 1978 at the University of Bath, professor of metallurgy from 1959 to 1967 at the University of Manchester
 Thomas Ward, artist

Abbeydale Secondary Modern School
 Bill Michie, Labour MP from 1983 to 2001 for Sheffield Heeley

Former teachers
 Susan Horner, director of curriculum from 2009 to 2010 at the QCA, now the Qualifications and Curriculum Development Agency (English teacher from 1974 to 1979)
 Eileen Stamers-Smith, headmistress from 1984 to 1985 of Malvern Girls' College (taught English at the girls' grammar school from 1952 to 1957)

References

External links 
Ofsted Report
The History of Abbeydale Grange School

Defunct schools in Sheffield
Educational institutions established in 1958
1958 establishments in England
Educational institutions disestablished in 2010
2010 disestablishments in England